United Airlines Flight 227 (N7030U), a scheduled passenger flight from LaGuardia Airport New York City to San Francisco International Airport, California, crashed short of the runway while attempting a scheduled landing at Salt Lake City International Airport, Utah, on Thursday, November 11, 1965.

Accident details

Flight 227, operated by a Boeing 727-22, registration  departed LaGuardia Airport at 08:35 MST (10:35 EST) for San Francisco, California, with scheduled stops in Cleveland, Chicago, Denver, and Salt Lake City. The flight to Denver was routine. In Denver a new flight crew took control of the plane: Captain Gale C. Kehmeier, First Officer Philip E. Spicer, and Second Officer Ronald R. Christensen. The flight took off from Denver at 16:54 MST, a few minutes after sunset.

During the flight, the first officer was flying the aircraft under the direction of the captain.

At 17:47, now under the direction of terminal control, the plane was cleared to approach. At 17:48, in response to the controller's request for the plane's altitude, the pilot replied "Okay we've slowed to two fifty and we're at ten we have the runway (34L) in sight now, we'll cancel and standby with your for traffic."

Around this time the first officer reached forward to advance the thrust levers to increase thrust, but the captain brushed his hand aside and said "Not yet."
The captain indicated in post-crash interviews that at this point he moved the thrust levers to the takeoff power position, but the engines failed to respond properly. However, both the testimonies of the other members of the flight crew and the data from the flight data recorder (FDR) indicate that the attempt to add power occurred only about ten seconds before impact.

At 17:52, the plane struck the ground  short of the runway, then slid . The separation of the landing gear and the No. 1 engine was the result of impact loading in excess of their design structural strength. The failure of the landing gear caused the rupture of fuel lines in the fuselage. The resulting fire, rather than the impact of the crash, accounted for all 43 fatalities. The incident occurred approximately forty minutes after sunset.

The Boeing aircraft had been delivered to United seven months earlier in April, and had less than 1,800 hours of flight time.

Investigation conclusions
This accident was blamed entirely on the bad judgment of the captain, Gale C. Kehmeier, for conducting the final approach from a position that was too high and too close to the airport to permit a descent at the normal and safe rate. When the plane crossed the outer marker, which marks the final approach segment, it was  too high.

The first officer, who was flying the aircraft under the captain's direction, attempted to add engine thrust. But the captain told him no and brushed his hands off the thrust levers. The captain took over the controls during the last few seconds, but it was too late to avoid crashing short of runway 34L. The plane impacted with a vertical acceleration force of 4.7-g.

That severe impact force broke off the left main landing gear and caused the right main gear to thrust up through the fuselage, rupturing pressurized fuel lines in the process. While the plane continued to slide down the runway on the nose gear and fuselage, pressurized fuel ignited inside the cabin, turning a survivable accident into a fatal accident. Many of the 50 people who successfully evacuated were severely burned.

The CAB (Civil Aeronautics Board) accident investigation revealed that the captain had a checkered training history. He had failed his initial jet transition training course, and was returned to flying the DC-6. Later on, he also failed to pass a routine annual instrument proficiency check.

References

External links
YouTube video – archived KSL-TV news coverage of crash from November 11, 1965
Combat Edge – USAF ACC safety magazine – summer 2018 – "Still alive and well today" – page 4

Aviation accidents and incidents in the United States in 1965
1965 in Utah
Airliner accidents and incidents caused by pilot error
277
Airliner accidents and incidents in Utah
Disasters in Utah
Accidents and incidents involving the Boeing 727
1960s in Salt Lake City
November 1965 events in the United States
Salt Lake City International Airport